Donna C. Peterson (born October 7, 1946) is an American politician and educator.

Peterson lived in Minneapolis, Minnesota and received her Bachelor of Arts in anthropology from University of Minnesota. She served in the Minnesota House of Representatives from 1980 to 1982 and in the Minnesota Senate from 1983 to 1990 and was a Democrat. Peterson resigned in January 1990 to become a lobbyist for the University of Minnesota, where she would work until her retirement in 2011. She was the associate vice president for government and community relations at the time of her retirement.

References

1946 births
Living people
Politicians from Minneapolis
University of Minnesota alumni
University of Minnesota faculty
Women state legislators in Minnesota
Democratic Party members of the Minnesota House of Representatives
Democratic Party Minnesota state senators